Manheim Borough Historic District is a national historic district located at Manheim, Lancaster County, Pennsylvania. The district includes 787 contributing buildings and 1 contributing site in the central business district and surrounding residential areas of Manheim.  The majority of the buildings are residential and include notable examples of the Italianate and Eastlake movement architectural styles and buildings designed by noted Lancaster architect C. Emlen Urban.  The buildings date from about 1762 to 1949, with the majority built between 1860 and 1930.  Notable non-residential buildings include the Stiegel / Arntz Building (1865-1875), Kready's Store, Manheim Railroad Station (1881), Manheim National Bank (1924), Keystone National Bank (1925), Eisenlohr Cigar Factory, Fuller Factory, Bond Caster and Wheel Corporation, Zion Evangelical Lutheran Church (1891), and Hope Hose Company Firehouse (1904).  The contributing site is the Zion Evangelical Lutheran Church cemetery.

It was listed on the National Register of Historic Places in 2000.

References

Historic districts on the National Register of Historic Places in Pennsylvania
Italianate architecture in Pennsylvania
Historic districts in Lancaster County, Pennsylvania
National Register of Historic Places in Lancaster County, Pennsylvania